The following is a list of New Mexico State Aggies men's basketball head coaches. The Aggies have had 27 coaches (not including the 2nd time for two coaches) in their 110-season history.

References

New Mexico State

New Mexico State Aggies basketball, men's, coaches